Loxopholis hexalepis, the six-scaled tegu, is a species of lizard in the family Gymnophthalmidae. It is found in Venezuela and Colombia.

References

Loxopholis
Reptiles described in 1982
Taxa named by Stephen Charles Ayala
Taxa named by Dennis M. Harris